is a 1982 Japanese film directed by Banmei Takahashi. The film was based on the life of Akiyoshi Umekawa.

Cast
 Ryudo Uzaki as Akio Takeda
 Keiko Sekine as Michiyo
 Misako Watanabe as Sadako Takeda
 Ayako Ōta (太田あや子) as Miyoko
 Yoshiko Osimi (忍海よしこ) as Satoko
 Jirō Yabuki as Teruya Shimada
 Shirō Shimomoto as Sato
 Hitoshi Ueki as President
 Kazuhiro Yamaji as Michiyo's new lover
 Maiko Kazama as Sanae

Background
Director Banmei Takahashi was at this point a veteran director of pink films with a resume of about 40 movies. This film in the action genre represents a new direction for Takahashi. Tattoo Ari was a critical and box-office hit and with his award for Best Director from the Yokohama Film Festival launched Takahashi on a mainstream career. The female lead in Tattoo Ari, Keiko Sekine, was Banmei Takahashi's wife and later acted under the name Keiko Takahashi.

Awards and nominations
4th Yokohama Film Festival 
 Won: Best Director - Banmei Takahashi
 Won: Best Actor - Ryudo Uzaki (宇崎竜童)
 3rd Best Film

References

External links
 

1982 films
Films about bank robbery
Films directed by Banmei Takahashi
1980s Japanese-language films
1980s Japanese films